Calathus ruficollis is a species of ground beetle in the family Carabidae. It is found in western North America, covering the California Floristic Province and continuing to the Pacific Northwest. Calathus ruficollis is flightless, predaceous, and nocturnal.

Subspecies
These four subspecies belong to the species Calathus ruficollis:
 Calathus ruficollis grandicollis Casey, 1920
 Range: southwestern British Columbia to Humboldt County, California
 Calathus ruficollis guadalupensis Casey, 1897
 Calathus ruficollis ignicollis Casey, 1920
 Range: eastern Washington, western Idaho, south to central California (including Sierra Nevada)
 Calathus ruficollis ruficollis Dejean, 1828
 Range: Mendocino County in California to Baja California and southern Arizona. Introduced in Hawaii.

References

Further reading

 
 

ruficollis
Articles created by Qbugbot
Beetles described in 1828